Gypsy Kings may refer to:
Gipsy Kings, a French musical group
King of the Gypsies, an informal title
King of the Gypsies (film), a 1978 American film